Toucountouna  is a town, arrondissement and commune in the Atakora Department of north-western Benin. The commune covers an area of 1600 square kilometres and as of 2013 had a population of 39,779 people.

See also
Manafaga

References

 

Communes of Benin
Populated places in Benin
Populated places in the Atakora Department
Arrondissements of Benin